= Loop Mania =

2016 video game

- App icon
- Developers: Umbrella; Games From Outer Space
- Publisher: Umbrella
- Platforms: iOS, Android
- Release: iOS; April 6, 2016; Android; May 27, 2016
- Genre: Action
- Mode: Single-player

Loop Mania is a 2016 action game developed by the American indie studio Umbrella and Games From Outer Space and published by Umbrella. It was released in April 2016 for iOS and in May 2016 for Android.

== Gameplay ==
In Loop Mania, the player controls a white circle that collects coins for points while avoiding enemy circles.

Loop Mania is an endless arcade video game which has the player controlling a white circle revolving around the inside of an outlined circle. The circle while revolving collects medium-sized dots that are called "coins" which add to the overall score above. Collecting multiple dots continuously results in an increased multiplier that adds to the score and collecting all progresses the player to another round, which increases in difficulty and occasionally changes color scheme.

Enemy circles can enter the circle and touching them can result in game over for the player. They can either be dodged or attacked by the player, which gains score as well.

== Release ==
The game was announced on April 6, 2016, on the Umbrella YouTube account and released on April 20 for the App Store and May 27 for Google Play.
